Nero is a luxury superyacht, measuring  in length. She was commissioned by Neil Taylor and built in 2007 by Corsair Yachts at Yantai Raffles Shipyard in China.

She is part of the Burgess Charter Fleet.

History

Nero was commissioned and designed by London-born entrepreneur Neil Taylor. Nero's design is based on a line of Corsair yachts built by J.P. Morgan. Taylor intended to restore a yacht from J.P. Morgan's era but was unable to find one that met his requirements, so he planned to build a modern replica. Its architecture was designed by IMT Marine Consultants. It was built by Corsair Yachts in China at Yantai Raffles Shipyard. The ship launched in 2008.

Also in 2009, the yacht was listed for sale with Merle Wood & Associates and Burgess at €75 million (US$98 million). In April 2011, the price was reduced to €67.5 million (US$88.2 million), and in 2012 the price was reduced again to €59.9 million (US$78.3 million).

In 2014, Nero was sold and in 2016 it underwent a renovation.

Features
Nero features a master duplex suite with ensuite bath and shower rooms, a private sundeck and swimming pool. It also includes a 'VIP' cabin, four other cabins, a 9.4m cabin cruiser, a 7.9m tender and a 5.5m side boarding platform.

See also
List of motor yachts by length

References

External links

Nero brochure

2007 ships
Ships built in China
Motor yachts